Brownville Hotel was a historic hotel located at Brownville in Jefferson County, New York.  It is a stone structure built about 1820.

It was listed on the National Register of Historic Places in 1980. In its former spot, a Stewart's shop now stands  after the roof collapsed and building was demolished

References

Houses on the National Register of Historic Places in New York (state)
Houses completed in 1820
Hotels established in 1820
Houses in Jefferson County, New York
National Register of Historic Places in Jefferson County, New York